Scott Joseph Cyr (born 1972 or 1973) is a Canadian politician who represents the electoral district of Bonnyville-Cold Lake in the Legislative Assembly of Alberta.

Political career 
Cyr was first elected in 2015, defeating his Progressive Conservative rival Craig Copeland to pick up Bonnyville-Cold Lake for Wildrose. The PC's had held the riding since 1997.

Shadow cabinet
When Wildrose leader Brian Jean unveiled his shadow cabinet in June 2015, Cyr was given the position of Deputy Whip, as well as Shadow Minister of Justice & Solicitor General.

In 2017, Cyr sponsored a private member's bill that would introduce a new tort law in Alberta covering the non-consensual sharing of explicit images. He cited a conversation with one of his daughters as the inspiration for the bill, as well as the highly-publicized cases of Amanda Todd and Rehtaeh Parsons. NDP Justice Minister Kathleen Ganley announced her support for the bill in the Legislature, and it was passed unanimously. The new law will come into force on August 4, 2017.

Cyr was moved to the role of Shadow Minister for Service Alberta in December 2016. When Wildrose merged with the Progressive Conservatives, he joined the new party and retained his role as critic.

Exit from politics 
The redistribution of electoral boundaries in 2017 abolished Bonnyville-Cold Lake, and Cyr initially indicated he would run for the United Conservative Party nomination in the new riding of Bonnyville-Cold Lake-St. Paul. However, Cyr withdrew after fellow MLA Dave Hanson, also a resident of the new district, declared he would run as well.

Personal life

Cyr holds a management degree in accounting and finance from the University of Lethbridge as well as a class 4 power engineering certificate. He worked as an accountant for 14 years prior to his election to the Legislative Assembly in 2015. He, his wife, and their two daughters reside in Cold Lake.

Electoral history

2015 general election

References

Wildrose Party MLAs
Living people
1970s births
21st-century Canadian politicians
University of Lethbridge alumni
United Conservative Party MLAs